Racism is a prevailing issue in the city of Columbus, Ohio, United States. Minority groups may face some societal, health, and legal challenges not experienced by non-minority residents.

Racism was recognized as a public health crisis in Columbus and its surrounding county, Franklin County, in 2020.

History

Columbus was established with a significant white population. The Civil War prompted some Black families moved from the South to northern cities, including Columbus, where they lived relatively integrated. A notable change took place with the Great Migration, where the city's racial makeup was significantly affected, and white attitudes soured toward other races.

The city was one of six in Ohio featured in the 1913 book The Color Line in Ohio: A History of Race Prejudice in a Typical Northern State. The author wrote "Columbus, the capital of Ohio, has a feeling toward the negroes all its own. In all my travels in the state, I found nothing just like it. It is not so much a rabid feeling of prejudice against the negroes simply because their skin is black as it is a bitter hatred for them."

Throughout much of the 20th century, African Americans were barred from lodging in many popular hotels, and from visiting many popular restaurants and entertainment venues. The Negro Motorist Green Book, published from 1936 to 1966, documented sites across the United States that were safe for African Americans to visit, and about 22 were listed in Columbus. Of these buildings, only four survive: the Macon Hotel, the Hotel St. Clair, the Cooper Tourist Home (at 259 N. 17th St.) and the Hawkins Tourist Home (at 70 N. Monroe Ave.).

In the early 20th century, racial discrimination was added into deeds, with 67 percent of all Central Ohio subdivisions found to have exclusionary covenants against people of color during a period from 1921 to 1935. A 1948 U.S. Supreme Court ruling, Shelley v. Kraemer, found these clauses to be unconstitutional. The Fair Housing Act, passed in 1968, further outlawed them. The practice continued on in Upper Arlington into the 1970s, and some of the racist language has remained, albeit unenforceable, in Ohio deeds into 2021; a law passed that year allowed for easy removal during property transfers.

In 1936, the Home Owners' Loan Corporation created a "residential security" map of Columbus. The federal agency was tasked with creating maps for every major U.S. city to define areas that are safe to give out loans to, as well as areas of higher risk. The maps used a practice known as redlining  discriminating on personal and business loans in neighborhoods on the basis of race and income. Areas with immigrants and African Americans were redlined in Columbus, despite several being middle-class or wealthy areas. A 2018 study by the National Community Reinvestment Coalition found that the redlined areas continue to suffer, more than the national average for historically redlined neighborhoods.

In the 1960s, the Interstate Highway System was built, including through Columbus. Interstates 670, 70, and 71 were built in and around Columbus. Redlined areas were targeted  minority and poor neighborhoods. These included the Near East Side, Milo-Grogan, Linden, and Flytown, the latter of which was completely demolished. White and affluent areas such as Bexley were left untouched. Interstate 70 split apart Hanford Village, a formerly independent Black neighborhood. The highway's construction involved the demolition of 60 houses in the middle-class neighborhood.

Also during the 1960s and onward, urban renewal became popular in Columbus. Minority and poor neighborhoods were targeted for "slum clearance", removal of dilapidated structures. The demolitions rarely involved replacement with affordable housing, and further increased the decline of these areas.

In the 1970s, Columbus City Schools challenged an aspect of the 1954 Brown v. Board of Education Supreme Court decision. A U.S. district judge ruled in 1977 that the school was intentionally creating school boundaries to separate white and Black students. The school district challenged the segregation ruling, bringing it to the U.S. Supreme Court. The court supported the judge's decision, forcing new busing routes in the school district. The new integration led some white students to say it was the first time they had seen a Black person. City school enrollment subsequently dropped as white families moved out of the Columbus district into the suburbs.

Gentrification has been an issue in the 21st century in minority neighborhoods. Poindexter Village was an affordable housing community in Bronzeville that was demolished in 2013 despite the residents wanting to remain, and advocating for its preservation.

During the COVID-19 pandemic, instances of institutional racism became evident. People of color were disproportionately affected, including with greater rates of contracting and being hospitalized with COVID-19 and greater economic losses during the pandemic. The city and county health departments set up mobile vaccination units for low-income areas and worked with community organizations to ensure culturally sensitive COVID messaging. Columbus Public Health reserved 20 percent of its vaccines for vulnerable populations.

In 2021, the Kirwan Institute for the Study of Race and Ethnicity at Ohio State University reported that Black and poor areas have had homes overvalued between 2010 and 2019. The overvaluing increased property taxes, sometimes with valuations 50 percent higher than their actual worth. Majority white neighborhoods were consistently undervalued. A 2017 audit of the county's last full reappraisal suggested improvements, leading the new county auditor to commission the study.

In 2021, the place of critical race theory in schools became a topic of debate nationwide. Several Central Ohio school districts began to discuss how to lecture on racism in schools. In July of that year, the Olentangy and Hilliard school district meetings were reportedly meeting parent opposition to anti-racist education.

In policing
The Columbus Division of Police (CPD) has faced numerous charges of racism. One prominent event took place at the Kahiki Supper Club in 1975, called the "Kahiki Incident", when two African American couples disputed charges on their restaurant bill. Amid a talk with management, police became involved and a physical altercation took place. Three of the four were arrested and jailed. The Black community pushed for the officers to be tried, and for a civilian review board. Two officers were fired, though reinstated two months later. A local radio DJ, Les Brown, took to the issue at WVKO. He took over extra airtime to talk about race issues and telling people to vote for John Rosemond (the first Black mayoral candidate on Columbus), which caused him to be fired. The radio station did not inform him, though they changed the locks in September 1975. Brown was let into the studio by a colleague, and he barricaded himself into the studio until WVKO staff removed the door hinges. Police prepared to arrest him, though about 3,000 Blacks were gathered outside, cheering in support of Brown. He went on to serve as a state legislator for two terms.

In 2020, three race-related lawsuits were being brought against the department, where Black officers alleged discrimination in hiring, staffing events, and promotions. The plaintiffs in one suit described a culture of discrimination against minorities in the force. The CPD has faced numerous allegations of racial injustice regarding Black Columbus residents who were injured or killed, and how it handled the George Floyd protests in the city.

In 2021, it was reported that the county sees unusually high rates of fatal police shootings: the highest rate for any urban county in Ohio, and 18th highest for urban counties nationally, from 2015 to 2020. Franklin County's fatal police shootings disproportionately affect African Americans, where the county has 20 percent of Ohio's Black population yet accounts for 33 percent of Ohio's records of African Americans fatally shot by law enforcement. In 2018, the Columbus Division of Police's use of force was also disproportionate, with 55 percent of use-of-force incidents targeting Black people, who only make up 29 percent of Columbus's population.

Actions

The city is working to reduce racism as it affects public health. In 2014, it launched CelebrateOne, a program to reduce infant mortality in Columbus, an issue especially present in minority neighborhoods. In 2020, the city launched the Center for Public Health Innovation, an entity with programs to promote physical activity, health screenings, and weight loss, to improve health and quality of life for residents.

Area hospitals are working to address racism, including the Wexner Medical Center. The Ohio State medical center has had anti-racism programs for years, though it increased efforts following the George Floyd protests in the city. UHCAN Ohio is an activist organization operating across the state to help set up similar anti-racism initiatives.

In 2020, the governments of Columbus and Franklin County each declared racism a public health crisis in their jurisdictions. The Franklin County Health Commissioner described a 15-20-year life expectancy gap between races, along with institutional policies and practices that affect people of color. Franklin County Public Health committed to 17 different actions to improve racial equality in the county.

Also in 2020, during the George Floyd protests, the city council voted to remove symbolism of Christopher Columbus due to his oppression of Native Americans. This included removing a 22-ft.-tall statue of Christopher Columbus and forming a study to redesign the city's seal and flag. Columbus State Community College had removed its statue of Columbus over the same issue earlier that year, and the city ceased celebrating Columbus Day in 2018.

Statistics

As of 2020, Black residents of Franklin County had a 11.1 percent unemployment rate, about double the overall unemployment. Home ownership rate for Black residents was 33.4 percent, 40 percent lower than the overall rate. 637 of 100,000 were in prison, a rate about three times higher than for the total population in Franklin County. Infant mortality was high, with a rate of 11 per 1,000 live births, over double the rate for non-Hispanic white residents. Life expectancy was lower, with an 18.3-year difference between the predominantly white Bexley residents (85.4 years) and the life expectancy of Near East Side residents (67.1 years), who are predominantly Black.

As of 2019, Columbus is the 55th-most racially segregated city in the U.S., in a ranking of cities with populations of 200,000 or more. The UC Berkeley report described the city's level of segregation as "High Segregation".

See also
 Racism in the United States

References

History of racism in Ohio
Columbus, Ohio
Columbus, Ohio